The Shengjinkou Formation is an Early Cretaceous (Aptian)-aged Konservat-Lagerstätte composed of "interbedded red green and yellow variegated mudstones and siltstones" that is part of the larger Tugulu Group of China. Dinosaur and pterosaur remains have been recovered from the formation.

The Shengjikou Formation was first identified in a 1956 manuscript by Xia Gongjun. The type locality is near Turpan City in  the Xinjiang Region of China.

In 2006 from the Hami region in Xinjiang, the Shengjinkou Formation, a Konservat-Lagerstätte was reported, in this case lake sediments allowing for an exceptional preservation of fossils. The same year, Qiu Zhanxiang and Wang Banyue started official excavations. Part of the finds consisted of dense concentrations of pterosaur bones, associated with soft tissues and eggs. The site represented a nesting colony that storm floods had covered with mud. Dozens of individuals could be secured from a total that in 2014 was estimated to run into the many hundreds. Dinosaur fossils were first reported from the formation in 2021.

Paleofauna

Hamipterus tianshanensis
Hamititan xinjiangensis
Silutitan sinensis
Somphospondyli (?) indet. (=Sauropoda indet.)
Theropoda indet.

References 

Geologic formations of China
Lower Cretaceous Series of Asia
Cretaceous China
Paleontology in Xinjiang